History of Greek photography from its beginning to the present

19th century photography

History
The History of Greek photography began with travellers from Canada and Europe to Greece. 

Pierre Gustave Joly de Lotbiniere (1798–1865, Canadian) and Joseph-Philibert Girault de Prangey (1804–1892, French) were among the examples of persons who came to Greece and took photographs of Greece (daguerreotypes) in 1830s or 1840s.

In 1840s, Philibert Perraud (1815-1863?), a French photographer, came to Greece and taught photography to Filippos Margaritis (Greek painter), who was said to be the first Greek photographer and who later opened the first Greek professional photo studio in 1853, in Athens.

In 1859, Greek photographer Petros Moraites opened his photo studio in Athens with Athanasios Kalfas. He took many portraits of many Greek people including the royal family and around 1870 became one of the most notable photographers in Greece at that time.

According to a guide book published in 1891, 27 photo studios existed in Greece.

Major photographers
Filippos Margaritis (1839–1892)
Leonidas Papazoglou (1872–1918, Λεωνίδας Παπάζογλου)

The first half of 20th century

History

Major photographers
Anastasios Gaziades (1853–1931) THE AMERICAN COLLEGE OF GREECE
Panayotis Fatseas, Panayiotis Fatseas (1888–1938, Παναγιώτης Φατσέας) portraits 2008 exhibition at the Benaki Museum
Nelly's, Elli Souyioultzoglou-Seraïdari (1889–1998, Έλλη Σουγιουλτζόγλου-Σεραϊδάρη)
Nikolaos Tombazis (1894–1986, Νικόλαος Τομπάζης)
Voula Papaioannou (1898–1990, Βούλα Παπαϊωάννου) documentary
Pericles Papachatzidakis (1905–1990, Περικλής Παπαχατζιδάκης)
Spyros Meletzis, Spiros Meletzis (1906–2003, Σπύρος Μελετζής)
Dimitris Harissiadis (1911–1993, Δημήτρης Χαρισιάδης)
Kostas Balafas (b. 1920–2011, Κώστας Μπαλάφας)

The second half of 20th century and 21st century

History

In 1952, the Greek Photographic Society (EFE) was founded and in 1956 the First Panhellenic Exhibition of Photographic Art in Athens was organized.

Photographers
In order of year of birth
Yiorgos Depollas (b. 1947)
John Stathatos (b. 1947)
Dimitris Yeros (b. 1948)
Nikos Economopoulos (b. 1953, Νίκος Οικονομόπουλος, Nikos Oikonomopoulos)
Vassilis Makris (b. 1958, Βασίλης Μακρής)
Ianna Andreadis (b. 1960)
Tzeli Hadjidimitriou (b. 1962, Jelly Hadjidimitriou, Τζέλη Χατζηδημητρίου)

non-Greek photographers relating to Greece
Pierre Gustave Joly de Lotbiniere (1798–1865, Canadian)
Joseph-Philibert Girault de Prangey (1804–1892, French)
Philibert Perraud (1815-1863?, French)
Reverend George Wilson Bridges
James Robertson (1813–1888)
Francis Frith (1822–1898)
Francis Bedford (1816–1894)
Fred Boissonnas (1858–1946, Swiss photographer)
Albert Meyer
Alfred-Nicolas Normand
Underwood & Underwood

Further reading
Alkis Xanthakis, History of Greek Photography, 1839-1960 (English translation by J. Solman & G. Cox), Hellenic literary & Historical Archives Society, Athens 1988
Kostas Ioannidis, Contemporary Greek Photography:A Century in Thirty Years, Athens, Futura, 2008 KAPUT Art magazine
Athens 1839–1900: Photographic Testimonies (Athens, 1985)
Athens 1839–1900: Photographic Record (Athens, Benaki Museum, 2003)
Das Land der Griechen mit der Seele Suchen (Cologne, 1990)
John Stathatos, The Invention of Landscape: Greek Landscape and Greek Photography, 1870–1995 (Thessaloniki, 1996)
John Stathatos, Image and Icon: The New Greek Photography 1975–1995 (1997).
Alkis X. Xanthakis, History of Greek Photography 1839-1970 2008 Papyros Publishing Company, Athens [Greek]
Aspects de la Photographie Hellénique (Nice, Ministère de la Culture Hellénique, Mairie de Nice, 1998)
Fani Constantinou, Photography by James Robertson 'Athens and the Grecian Antiquities' 1853-1854 from the Photographic Archive of the Benaki Museum, Athens, Benaki Museum, 1998
Alkis Xanthakis, Filippos Margaritis The First Greek Photographer, Athens: Photographos, 1900 [Greek]
Alkis Xanthakis, Nineteenth Century Greece through the lens of Petros Moraitis, Athens, Potamos, 2001 [Greek]
Haris Yiakoumis, La Grè ce Photographique et Littèraire au XIXe siècle. Athens, Bastas-Plessas, 1997
 Haris Yiakoumis, The Acropolis of Athens, Photographs 1839–1959, Athens, Potamos, 2000

See also
List of Greek photographers
History of photography
List of photographers
History of Japanese photography

External links
Benaki Museum Photographic Archives
Thessaloniki Museum of Photography
John Stathatos: Texts on Greek photography

Lists of photographers by nationality
Greek photographers
Photography in Greece
Photographers